Kedrov (from кедр meaning cedrus) is a Russian male surname, its feminine counterpart is Kedrova. It may refer to:

Bonifaty Kedrov (1903–1985), Soviet researcher, philosopher, logician, chemist and psychologist
Lila Kedrova (1918–2000), Russian-born French actress
Mikhail Nikolayevich Kedrov (1894–1972), Soviet theatre director
Mikhail Sergeevich Kedrov (1878–1941), Soviet politician
Nikolay Kedrov Sr. (1871–1940), Russian composer of liturgical music
Nikolay Kedrov Jr. (1905–1981), Russian composer of liturgical music

Russian-language surnames